This is a list of football coaches with a .750 or greater winning percentage.  College football coaches who have coached college teams for 10 or more seasons are included in the list. "College level" is defined as a four-year college or university program in either the National Association of Intercollegiate Athletics (NAIA) or the National Collegiate Athletic Association (NCAA). If the team competed at a time before the official organization of either of the two groups, but is generally accepted as a "college football program," it is also included.

Leading the list is Larry Kehres, who compiled a  winning percentage while coaching the Mount Union Purple Raiders from 1986 to 2012. The longest tenure among coaches on the list is that of John Gagliardi, who was a head coach from 1949 until retiring after the 2012 season. Gagliardi also leads all listed coaches in total games, wins, and losses. Former Vanderbilt head coach Dan McGugin has the most ties of anyone on the list.

Key

College football coaches with a .750 winning percentage

List may be incomplete; updated through 2021 season.

Note: As of the end of the 2010 season, Jim Tressel, who served as the head football coach for Youngstown State (1986–2000) and Ohio State (2001–2010), had a career record of 241–79–2 for a winning percentage of .752. In July 2011, Ohio State vacated all 12 of its wins from the 2010 season, dropping Tressel's career record to 229–79–2 and his winning percentage to .742.

Active coaches near a .750 winning percentage
This list identifies active coaches who have:
a winning percentage of .735 or greater after at least 10 full seasons as a college football head coach, or
a winning percentage of .750 or greater after at least 7 full seasons, but fewer than 10, as a college football head coach.
Updated through end of 2021 season.

College football coaches with an .850 winning percentage

The main list set forth above is limited to coaches with 10 years of experience as a head coach. This list supplements the main list by identifying coaches who are omitted from the main list because they have not coached 10 years, but who have achieved a winning percentage of .850 or higher while coaching a minimum of five seasons or 50 games.
List may be incomplete; updated through 2021 season.

See also
 List of college football coaches with 200 wins
 List of college football coaches with 100 losses
 List of college football coaches with 0 career wins
 List of college football coaches with 30 seasons
 List of college football coaches with 20 ties

Notes

References

.750 winning percentage